Charles B. Witmer (April 18, 1862 – April 7, 1925) was a United States district judge of the United States District Court for the Middle District of Pennsylvania.

Education and career

Born in Northumberland County, Pennsylvania, Witmer received an Artium Baccalaureus degree from Central Pennsylvania Business School (now Central Penn College) in 1883 and read law to enter the bar in 1887. He was county solicitor for Northumberland County from 1888 to 1891 and from 1894 to 1900. He was an Assistant Attorney General for the Spanish Treaty Claims Commission from 1902 to 1904. He then served as chief counsel for the Pennsylvania Dairy Food Commission from 1904 to 1905, and as a special counsel to the Pennsylvania Auditor General's Department from 1905 to 1906. He was the United States Marshal for the Middle District of Pennsylvania from 1906 to 1907. He was the United States Attorney for the Middle District of Pennsylvania from 1907 to 1911.

Federal judicial service

On February 20, 1911, Witmer was nominated by President William Howard Taft to a seat on the United States District Court for the Middle District of Pennsylvania vacated by the impeachment and conviction of Judge Robert W. Archbald. Witmer was confirmed by the United States Senate on March 2, 1911, and received his commission the same day. Witmer served in that capacity until his death on April 7, 1925.

References

Sources
 

1862 births
1925 deaths
Judges of the United States District Court for the Middle District of Pennsylvania
United States district court judges appointed by William Howard Taft
20th-century American judges
United States Marshals
United States Attorneys for the Middle District of Pennsylvania
United States federal judges admitted to the practice of law by reading law